Shaniko is a city located in Wasco County, Oregon, United States, on U.S. Route 97 and about  north of Antelope. The population was 36 at the 2010 census.

Geography 
Shaniko is in Wasco County, in north-central Oregon, at the intersection of U.S. Route 97 and Oregon Route 218.

On the high plateau on which Shaniko was built, the soil is thin and the vegetation sparse, consisting mainly of sagebrush, bunchgrass, and occasional junipers. Many peaks of the Cascade Range, including Hood, Jefferson, Adams, St. Helens and Rainier, are visible from the city.

History 
The first European Americans came to the Shaniko area after the discovery of gold in Canyon City, Oregon, in 1862. Camps were made wherever water could be found. One camp, which became the farming community of Bakeoven, was closely associated with the future town of Shaniko, while another camp, Cross Hollow, was within the present Shaniko city limits. In 1867, following complaints of hostile Indians and fear of robbery of those transporting gold, the State of Oregon received a grant from the United States government to build a military wagon road from The Dalles to Fort Boise in what was then Washington Territory, (now Idaho). Following this road, homesteaders began claiming land in Central Oregon that previously had been fairly inaccessible.

One of these settlers was August Scherneckau, who came to the area after the Civil War, in 1874. The spelling of the town's name reflects local Native American pronunciation of Scherneckau's name. The town was originally called Cross Hollow, and a post office by that name was established in May 1879 with Scherneckau as postmaster. Cross Hollow post office closed in 1887, and Shaniko post office opened in 1900. An application to incorporate the city was submitted February 9, 1901, and the first official meeting of the Shaniko city council occurred on March 16, 1901.

The town's heyday was the first decade of the 20th century, when Shaniko served as a transportation hub spurred by the presence of the Columbia Southern Railway, a subsidiary of Union Pacific Railroad, which built a branch from Biggs Junction to a terminus in Shaniko. That branch was completed in May 1900. The region served by the city even stretched into Idaho, south to Klamath Falls, Oregon, and beyond, because of rail connections to the main line.

The residents of Shaniko voted to incorporate Shaniko and elected a mayor, F. T. Hurlbert, and other city officials on January 1, 1902. It was surrounded by cattle ranches, which produced livestock for shipment that filled 400 railroad cars that year. In 1903, when Shaniko gained the nickname, "Wool Capital of the World", they shipped 2,229 tons of wool and 1,168,866 bushels of wheat. They made $3,000,000 in wool sales in 1903. The second sale of that year one warehouse deposited a million into the bank. There was a third sale that year as well. In 1904, total annual sales were five million dollars.

By 1911, the Oregon–Washington Railroad and Navigation Company, another Union Pacific subsidiary, began using an alternate route linking Portland to Bend by way of the Deschutes River canyon. The new line, advertised as the "direct, quick and natural route", diverted traffic from the Columbia Southern, and Shaniko began to decline. Passenger rail service to Shaniko ended in the early 1930s, and the entire line was shut down by 1966. By 1982 Shaniko was nearly a ghost town. Shaniko was first called a "ghost town" at the Oregon Centennial Exposition in Portland in 1959.

In the 1980s, an out-of-town developer attempted to restore the Shaniko Hotel but later sold the property to Robert Pamplin Jr. Though the hotel was listed for sale for quite some time, it has been taken off of the market.

Shaniko attracts ghost town tourists, but a wastewater issue still prevents any large scale tourism efforts from forming. Local businesses operate seasonally from April to September to accommodate the tourists, including those in "Shaniko Row".

Demographics 

As of the census of 2010, there were 36 people, 17 households, and 11 families residing in the city. The racial makeup of the city was 75% White, 8.3% Asian, and 16.7% from two or more races. Hispanic or Latino of any race were 8.3% of the population.

There were 17 households, of which about 18% had children under the age of 18 living with them, about 53% were married couples living together, about 6% had a female householder with no husband present, about 6% had a male householder with no wife present, and about 35% were non-families. About 29% of all households were made up of individuals, and about 18% had someone living alone who was 65 years of age or older. The average household size was 2.12 and the average family size was 2.55.

The median age in the city was about 55 years. About 17% of residents were under the age of 18; about 3% were between the ages of 18 and 24; 19.5% were from 25 to 44; about 28% were from 45 to 64; and about 33% were 65 years of age or older. The gender makeup of the city was about 58% male and 42% female.

Points of interest

Shaniko and environs contain an individual historic building and two historic districts listed on the National Register of Historic Places (NRHP):
 Columbia Southern Hotel
 Imperial Stock Ranch Headquarters Complex
 Shaniko Historic District, including the Columbia Southern Hotel, the city hall and jailhouse, a schoolhouse, and 42 other properties, some of which have been renovated. The NRHP nomination form for the district provides historical details, references, images, and descriptions.

References

External links 

Official site
Entry for Shaniko from the Oregon Blue Book, including a link to a local road map (in PDF format) from ODOT
Historic photos of Shaniko from the Salem Public Library
Official site of The Last Days of Shaniko

Cities in Oregon
Cities in Wasco County, Oregon
Ghost towns in Oregon
Populated places established in 1879
1879 establishments in Oregon
Railway towns in Oregon